Andrew Julio Santaniello (August 31, 1926 – March 15, 1986) was a Republican member of the Connecticut Senate, representing Norwalk and part of Darien, Connecticut in Connecticut's 25th District from 1983 to 1986. He died in office on March 15, 1986. He was a real estate agent and owned Santaniello Associates in Norwalk. He was on the General Assembly's executive and legislative nominations committee and was a member of the planning and development committee.

Early life and family 
Santaniello was born Norwalk, Connecticut on August 31, 1926. He was the son of Andrew Santaniello and Julia Ciarlella.

Legacy 
 Andrew J. Santaniello Park is named for him.

References 

Republican Party Connecticut state senators
Politicians from Norwalk, Connecticut
1926 births
1986 deaths
American people of Italian descent
American real estate brokers
20th-century American businesspeople
20th-century American politicians